Sahara is a 2005 action-adventure film directed by Breck Eisner based on the best-selling 1992 novel of the same name by Clive Cussler. It stars Matthew McConaughey, Steve Zahn and Penélope Cruz, and follows a treasure hunter who partners with a WHO doctor to find a lost American Civil War Ironclad warship in the Sahara Desert.

The film was shot in 2003 on-location in Morocco as well as in the United Kingdom. It became notable for its many production issues, including doubling its production budget from $80 million to $160 million, lawsuits among the crew, and being accused of several violations of international law. Sahara grossed $119 million worldwide at the box-office, ultimately failing to recoup all of its costs and is often listed among the biggest box-office failures of all-time.

Plot
In 1865, at the conclusion of the American Civil War, Richmond, Virginia is in ruins. The CSS Texas, captained by Mason Tombs, is loaded with the last of the Confederacy's gold to keep it from Union forces. It then disappears into the Atlantic.

In present day Mali, there is a civil war between dictator General Kazim and the Tuareg people. In Nigeria, WHO doctors Eva Rojas and Frank Hopper investigate a disease affecting people who have been in Mali. Zakara, a corrupt Tuareg, tries to murder Eva, but she is rescued by Dirk Pitt, from the National Underwater and Marine Agency, who was diving nearby.

Dirk gets a gold Confederate coin found in the Niger. A clue to the long-lost Texas, Dirk borrows his boss Sandecker's yacht to search for it. His partner Al Giordino and Rudi Gunn from NUMA accompany him. They first transport Eva and Hopper to Mali so they can continue investigating the disease, then continue up the Niger.

Businessman Yves Massarde and dictator General Kazim try to stop the doctors from discovering the source of the disease. Kazim sends men to attack the yacht. Dirk, Al, and Rudi survive, but the yacht is destroyed. Rudi leaves to get help while Dirk and Al go to rescue the doctors.

Kazim's men track down the doctors and kill Hopper. Dirk and Al rescue Eva. As they are leaving Mali, they are captured by the Tuareg insurgents. Convincing the group that they are hunted by Kazim, their leader, Modibo, shows Eva his people dying from the disease she is following. She finds out water contains toxins, and there is no treatment available. Al stumbles into a cave with a painting showing the ironclad Texas. Dirk believes that the Texas became stranded when the river dried up and the same river that carried the ship now runs underground.

Following the river bed to the border, they stumble upon Massarde's solar plant, the source of the contamination. The chemicals are seeping slowly towards the ocean, where they will expand rapidly upon entering salt water and kill ocean life worldwide. The US government won't intervene during a civil war in a sovereign country. Massarde and Zakara capture them, keep Eva, and send Dirk and Al in a truck to Kazim. They escape in the middle of the desert. Rebuilding a plane wreck into a land yacht, they leave the desert.

Dirk and Al return to the plant, with Modibo's help. To cover up the existence of the waste, Massarde plans to destroy it with explosives. Fearing the plant's destruction would guarantee worldwide water contamination, Al goes to remove the explosives while Dirk tries to rescue Eva. Dirk kills Zakara after a vicious fight, but Massarde escapes via helicopter. Al successfully neutralizes the explosive, angering Massarde.

The three leave the plant in an Avions Voisin C-28, and Kazim pursues them in an attack helicopter, with his army following. A series of explosions along the dry river bed reveals the wreckage of the Texas. The trio hides in the ship, using its cannon to destroy Kazim and his helicopter, killing him. Modibo arrives with Tuareg reinforcements, forcing Kazim's army to surrender and end the civil war.

The plant is shut down, stopping the source of toxic waste, and the rest is dealt with. Sandecker agrees to work covertly for the US government in exchange for NUMA funding. The Texas gold, technically belonging to the Confederate States of America, is left with Modibo's people. It is implied that Massarde is poisoned by Carl, an undercover US agent, while Dirk and Eva start a relationship.

Cast
 Matthew McConaughey as Dirk Pitt
 Steve Zahn as Al Giordino
 Penélope Cruz as Eva Rojas
 Lambert Wilson as Yves Massarde
 Lennie James as Brigadier General Zateb Kazim
 William H. Macy as Admiral James Sandecker
 Rainn Wilson as Commander Rudi Gunn
 Delroy Lindo as Carl
 Patrick Malahide as Ambassador Polidori
 Glynn Turman as Frank Hopper
 Dayna Cussler as Kitty Mannock (Deleted scenes)
 Robert Cavanah as Captain Tombs
 Paulin Fudouop as Modibo
 Jude Akuwudike as Imam
 Clint Dyer as Oshodi
 Mark Aspinall as Lawyer
 Rakie Ayola as Mrs. Nwokolo
 Christopher Bello as Train Driver
 Nicholas Beveney as Gunboat 1 Officer
 Maurice Lee as Zakara

Production
Principal photography began in November 2003, with the film being shot primarily on-location in Morocco, with portions in England (Hampshire and Shepperton Studios) and in Spain. One 46-second action sequence cost $2 million to film but ended up not making the final cut. McConaughey was paid $8 million, Penélope Cruz was paid $1.6 million, and Rainn Wilson was paid $45,000. A total of 10 screenwriters were used to polish the script, with four eventually receiving credit, which added $3.8 million to the film's budget; David S. Ward made $500,000 for his uncredited work.

Costs and bribery allegations
Initially green-lit with a production budget of $80 million, costs rose to $100 million by the time shooting started and had ballooned to $160 million by the time production wrapped, with a further $61 million in distribution expenses.  In 2014, the Los Angeles Times listed the film as one of the most expensive flops of all time.

The Los Angeles Times presented an extensive special report on April 15, 2007, dissecting the budget of Sahara as an example of how Hollywood movies can cost so much to produce and fail. Many of the often closely held documents had been leaked after a lawsuit involving the film. Among some of the items in the budget were bribes to the Moroccan government, some of which may have been legally questionable under American law.

Marketing 
To promote the film, actor Matthew McConaughey drove his own Airstream trailer (painted with a large Sahara movie poster on each side) across America, stopping at military bases and many events such as the Daytona 500 (to Grand Marshal the race), premiering the movie to fans, signing autographs, and doing interviews at each stop. The trip's highlights were shown on an E! channel special to coincide with the film's release. McConaughey also kept a running blog of his trip on MTV's entertainment website.

According to McConaughey, this film was intended to be the first in a franchise based on Clive Cussler's Dirk Pitt novels (much like the James Bond one), but the poor box-office performance has stalled plans for a sequel.

Reception

Critical response

On Rotten Tomatoes, the film has an approval rating of 38% based on 178 reviews, with an average rating of 5.2/10. The website's critics consensus reads: "A mindless adventure flick with a preposterous plot." Metacritic assigned the film a weighted average score of 41 out of 100, based on 33 critics, indicating "mixed or average reviews". Audiences polled by CinemaScore gave the film an average grade of "B+" on an A+ to F scale.

Box office
The film opened at number one in the US box office, taking $18 million on its first weekend and ultimately grossed $69 million. It earned a further $50 million overseas, for a worldwide total of $119 million. The box-office take of the film amounted to barely half of its overall expenses. The film lost approximately $105 million, according to a financial executive assigned to the movie; however, Hollywood accounting methods assign losses at $78.3 million, taking into account projected revenue. According to Hollywood accounting, the film had a projected revenue of $202.9 million against expenses of $281.2 million.

Awards

Legal action
For almost a decade, Cussler was involved in a lengthy legal action suit against the film's producer, Philip Anschutz, and his film entertainment company, Crusader Entertainment LLC (now part of the Anschutz Entertainment Group). It began in February 2005 when Cussler sued Anschutz and Crusader for $100 million for failing to consult him on the script. The author also claimed breach of contract because Crusader had failed to take up the option of a second book; Anschutz counter-sued for "alleged blackmail and sabotage attempts against the film prior to its 2005 release." Cussler claimed he had been assured "absolute control" over the book's film adaptation, but when this did not happen, he believed this contributed to its failure at the box office. He said in a statement, "They deceived me right from the beginning. They kept lying to me... and I just got fed up with it." However, Anschutz's company counter-sued, claiming it had been the behavior of Cussler that contributed to the film's problems. They claimed Cussler did have certain approval rights regarding the script and selection of actors and directors, but he had been an obstructive presence, rejecting many screenplay revisions and attacking the film in the media before it was even released. On May 15, 2007, a jury found in Anschutz's favor and awarded him $5 million in damages. On January 8, 2008, Judge John Shook decided that Crusader Entertainment was not required to pay Cussler $8.5 million for rights to the second book. On March 10, 2009, the same judge ordered Cussler to pay $13.9 million in legal fees to the production company.

A year later, in March 2010, the California Court of Appeals overturned Judge Shook's decision to award Anschutz and Crusader $5 million in damages and nearly $14 million in legal fees. Cussler then attempted to restart legal proceedings in July 2010 by filing a new lawsuit in the Los Angeles Superior Court, claiming the appeals court gave him back the right to recover the $8.5 million he believed Crusader owed him on a second book.

In response, the production company's lawyer said, "They're trying to pretend this wasn't already litigated. Cussler has never been able to accept the fact that he lost this case. He didn't accept the jury verdict, then for a year they tried to get the trial court judge to say the jury determined (Cussler was) entitled to $8.5 million and the court said absolutely not. They then sought an appeal and it didn't work. Then they appealed to the California Supreme Court and they didn't take the case. So, despite having had multiple courts say no, they are trying all over again."

There were no further developments in the case for almost three years until December 2012 when both parties were back in court to hear which side was responsible for paying the case's $20 million legal bill. However, the Second Appellate District for California's Appeals Court declared that "there was no prevailing party for purposes of attorney fees." It concluded that "after years of litigation both sides recovered nothing -- not one dime of damages and no declaratory relief."

References

External links

 
 

2005 films
2005 action comedy films
2000s adventure comedy films
2000s buddy comedy films
American action adventure films
American action comedy films
American adventure comedy films
American buddy comedy films
British action comedy films
Dirk Pitt films
2000s English-language films
English-language German films
English-language Spanish films
Films about friendship
Films based on adventure novels
Films based on American novels
Films directed by Breck Eisner
Films produced by Mace Neufeld
Films scored by Clint Mansell
Films set in Africa
Films set in the Sahara
Films set in Mali
Films set in Niger
Films set in Nigeria
Films shot in Morocco
German action adventure films
Paramount Pictures films
Spanish action adventure films
Films with screenplays by Thomas Dean Donnelly and Joshua Oppenheimer
Techno-thriller films
Treasure hunt films
2005 directorial debut films
2005 comedy films
German action comedy films
Spanish action comedy films
2000s American films
2000s British films
2000s German films